On November 5, 2002, the District of Columbia held a U.S. House of Representatives election for its shadow representative. Unlike its non-voting delegate, the shadow representative is only recognized by the district and is not officially sworn or seated. First-term incumbent Shadow Representative Ray Browne was successfully reelected.

Primary elections
Primary elections were held on September 10.

Democratic primary

Candidates
 Susana Baranano,  paralegal
 Ray Browne, incumbent Shadow Representative

Results

Other primaries
A Republican primary was held but no candidates filed and only write-in votes were cast. Adam Eidinger was the only Statehood-Green candidate and received just under 90% of the vote.

General election
The general election took place on November 2, 2002.

Results

References

Washington, D.C., Shadow Representative elections
2002 elections in Washington, D.C.